Aisin Gioro Yicai (奕采, 20 April 1820 - 21 February 1866) was Qing dynasty imperial prince as a biological son of Mianzhi, Prince Yishun of the Second Rank and the third in Prince Qing peerage as an adoptive son of Mianmin.

Life 
Yicai was born on 20 April 1820 to lady An, Mianzhi's mistress. In 1836, he was adopted as Mianmin's son as all children of the prince Qingliang of the Second Rank died prematurely. Shortly after the adoption, Yicai inherited Mianmin's title because the peerage was neither promoted to the first rank nor granted a status of qinwang. The promotional ceremony was held at the New Year (除夕夜). Around 1842, Yicai was accused of accepting bribes from officials. Daoguang Emperor  issued a decree imprisoning him at the Imperial Clan Court together with consorts for further investigation. His mother was punished by deprivation of her allowance. As the accusations were confirmed, Yicai was stripped of his title. The title was later passed to Yikuang, who was finally promoted to the prince of the first rank in 1889.

Yicai did not recover the previous title. Nevertheless, he was not granted red girdles because of his later deeds. In 1855, he falsely reported that his elder brother Yiyin guarded the Western Qing tombs. He was relocated to the capital  and died on 21 February 1866.

Family 
Yicai was initially married to lady Irgen Gioro and later married lady Ulanghan, daughter of Tuo'enduo (拖恩多).

 Primary consort, of the Irgen Gioro clan
 Second Primary consort, of the Ulanghan clan (d.1867)
 Zaiju (载钜, 1845–1847), third son
 Zaidi (载棣, 1849–1872), fifth son
 Zaipang (载庞, 1854-?), sixth son. Married lady Irgen Gioro, lady Bai and had issue (4 sons)
 Mistress, of the Wang clan
 Mistress, of the Xu clan (庶福晋 许氏)
 Mistress of the Li clan (庶福晋 李氏)
 Zaixian (载铣, 1842–1886), first son. Married lady Ezhuo and had issue (2 sons, including Puzhai and Puyi)
 Zaichong (载冲), second son
 Mistress, of the Liu clan (庶福晋 刘氏)
 Zai'ao (载鏊, 1846–1884), fourth son. Married lady Ligiya.
 Mistress, of the Chen clan (庶福晋 陈氏)

References 

Prince Qing
Qing dynasty imperial princes
1820 births
1866 deaths